Wallace Douglas Hawkes (11 September 1893 – 2 August 1974) was a British motor car designer, businessman and racing driver.  He was born in Barton, Gloucestershire, and died, aged 80, in Athens, Greece.

Indy 500 results

References

1893 births
1974 deaths
English racing drivers
Indianapolis 500 drivers
24 Hours of Le Mans drivers